Arthur Sergei Minasyan (born 9 August 1978) is an Armenian former footballer who played as a midfielder and made four appearances for the Armenia national team.

Career
Minasyan made his international debut for Armenia on 9 October 1999 in a UEFA Euro 2000 qualifying match against Andorra, which finished as a 3–0 away win. He made four appearances in total for Armenia, earning his last cap on 12 February 2001 in the 2001 Albena-Mobiltel Tournament against Uzbekistan. Minasyan scored his only international goal in the match to double Armenia's lead, with the fixture finishing as a 2–0 win.

Career statistics

International

International goals

References

External links
 
 
 

1978 births
Living people
Armenian footballers
Armenian expatriate footballers
Armenian expatriate sportspeople in Switzerland
Expatriate footballers in Switzerland
Armenian expatriate sportspeople in Russia
Expatriate footballers in Russia
Armenian expatriate sportspeople in Cyprus
Expatriate footballers in Cyprus
Armenia international footballers
Association football midfielders
Nairi SC players
FC Yerevan players
FC Ararat Yerevan players
FC Lausanne-Sport players
FC Dynamo Moscow players
Spartak Yerevan FC players
FC Urartu players
Anorthosis Famagusta F.C. players
FC Pyunik players
Lernayin Artsakh FC players
Ulisses FC players
Kilikia FC players
Armenian Premier League players
Swiss Super League players
Cypriot First Division players